Delotid may be a misspelling of:

 Dilaudid, an opioid pain medication
 Deltoid (disambiguation)